|}

This is a list of electoral district results of the 1927 Western Australian election.

Results by Electoral district

Albany

Avon

Beverley

Boulder

Brownhill-Ivanhoe

Bunbury 

 Preferences were not distributed.

Canning

Claremont

Collie

Coolgardie

Cue

East Perth 

 Preferences were not distributed.

Forrest

Fremantle 

 Preferences were not distributed.

Gascoyne

Geraldton

Greenough

Guildford

Hannans

Irwin

Kalgoorlie 

 Preferences were not distributed.

Kanowna

Katanning

Kimberley 

 Preferences were not distributed.

Leederville 

 Preferences were not distributed.

Menzies 

 Preferences were not distributed.

Moore

Mount Leonora

Mount Magnet

Mount Margaret

Murchison

Murray-Wellington

Nelson 

 Preferences were not distributed.

North Perth

North-East Fremantle

Northam

Perth 

 Preferences were not distributed.

Pilbara 

 Preferences were not distributed.

Pingelly 

 Preferences were not distributed.

Roebourne

South Fremantle

Subiaco

Sussex

Swan

Toodyay

Wagin

West Perth

Williams-Narrogin

Yilgarn 

 Preferences were not distributed.

York 

 Preferences were not distributed.

See also 

 1927 Western Australian state election
 Members of the Western Australian Legislative Assembly, 1927–1930

References 

Results of Western Australian elections
1927 elections in Australia